Monterrubio de la Serena is a municipality in the province of Badajoz, Extremadura, Spain. According to the 2014 census, the municipality has a population of 2537 inhabitants.

See also
La Serena

References

External links

Municipalities in the Province of Badajoz